Nikolay Kolev (Bulgarian: Николай Колев; born 29 March 1990) is a Bulgarian footballer who plays as a midfielder for Oborishte Panagyurishte.

Career
On 24 January 2017, Kolev signed with Nesebar.  He moved to Maritsa Plovdiv in June 2017. He left the club at the end of the 2017–18 season following the relegation to Third League.

In July 2018, Kolev joined Oborishte.

References

External links

1990 births
Living people
Bulgarian footballers
First Professional Football League (Bulgaria) players
Second Professional Football League (Bulgaria) players
PFC Dobrudzha Dobrich players
FC Lyubimets players
FC Dunav Ruse players
PFC Nesebar players
FC Maritsa Plovdiv players
FC Oborishte players
Association football midfielders